The Grammy Award for Best Latin Urban Album has been awarded since 2008. Years reflect the year in which the Grammy Awards were presented, for works released in the previous year. In 2009, this category was joined with the Latin Rock field, to be renamed Best Latin Rock, Alternative or Urban Album.

Recipients

See also

.
Chicano rap
Latin hip hop
Urban Album
Latin Urban Album
Latin Urban Album
Awards established in 2008
Awards disestablished in 2010
Album awards